Victoria Federica de Todos los Santos de Marichalar y Borbón, Lady of Tejada  (born 9 September 2000) is the younger child and only daughter of Infanta Elena, Duchess of Lugo, and Jaime de Marichalar. She is a granddaughter of King Juan Carlos I and Queen Sofía of Spain and a niece of King Felipe VI. Victoria is fifth in the line of succession to the Spanish throne after her cousins, King Felipe's daughters Leonor, Princess of Asturias, and Infanta Sofía; her mother; and her brother, Felipe.

Early life 

Victoria de Marichalar y Borbón was born 9 September 2000 at 13:00 in Ruber International Hospital in Madrid. 

She made her first Holy Communion on 27 May 2009 at the Dominicos Church in Alcobendas, Spain.

She has studied business administration and management at the College for International Studies in Madrid.

Career  
Marichalar has been reported to be working in the fashion industry and is quoted as saying that fashion is her "true vocation" ("verdadera vocación").

References

2000 births
Living people
Spanish untitled nobility
Spanish people of British descent
Spanish people of Danish descent
Spanish people of German descent
Spanish people of Greek descent
Spanish people of Russian descent